Asaracus is a genus of South American jumping spiders that was first described by Carl Ludwig Koch in 1846.

Species
 it contains five species, found only in Venezuela, Guyana, and Brazil:
Asaracus megacephalus C. L. Koch, 1846 (type) – Brazil
Asaracus modestissimus (Caporiacco, 1947) – Guyana
Asaracus rufociliatus (Simon, 1902) – Brazil, Guyana
Asaracus semifimbriatus (Simon, 1902) – Brazil
Asaracus venezuelicus (Caporiacco, 1955) – Venezuela

References

Salticidae
Salticidae genera
Spiders of South America
Taxa named by Carl Ludwig Koch